E51 may refer to:
 Nokia E51, a Symbian OS smartphone
 HMS E51, a British E class submarine
 European route E51, a road connecting Berlin and Nuremberg in Germany
 Nimzo-Indian Defence, Encyclopaedia of Chess Openings code
 Higashi-Kantō Expressway, route E51 in Japan